The Oldsmobile Firenza was a compact car which was produced by Oldsmobile from 1982 to 1988. It was based on the front-wheel drive GM J platform, which was shared with the Buick Skyhawk, Cadillac Cimarron, Chevrolet Cavalier and Pontiac Sunbird. It was not based on the European market Vauxhall Firenza, but on the same platform as the Vauxhall Cavalier Mk 2 / Opel Ascona C. The Firenza name was previously used as a performance package on the previous generation Oldsmobile Starfire hatchback.

Overview
The all-new Firenza was introduced in March 1982, as a replacement for the departed rear-wheel drive Starfire. Initially available as a two-door hatchback and four-door sedan, the lineup was expanded to include a 4-door "Cruiser" wagon in 1983, and a two-door notchback coupe in 1986. The name "Cruiser" was applied to all Oldsmobile station wagons at the time; this included the mid-sized Cutlass Cruiser and full-size Custom Cruiser. The Firenza was positioned as Oldsmobile's entry-level compact car, priced below the slightly larger Omega and later Calais/Cutlass Calais. Despite this, the Firenza could be equipped with premium options such as power windows, power locks, and 14-inch alloy wheels. The 1982 Firenza LX sedan was listed for $8,080 ($ in  dollars ). It is named for the Italian translation of the city of Florence. 

Although closely related to its J-body siblings, the Oldsmobile Firenza was badge engineered with distinctively Oldsmobile front and rear-end styling found on larger Oldsmobiles of the time. The upper portion of the Firenza front end featured quad rectangular headlights separated by signal lights in recessed housings, with a sloped body-color panel between the recesses. The dashboard unit was a unique design shared only with the Buick Skyhawk.

A horizontal-barred grille was mounted in the lower portion of the front fascia. The rear featured nearly square taillights with a slight wraparound at the outboard ends of the upper rear panel. The suspension was shared with the front-wheel-drive Omega and Cutlass Ciera, which consisted of MacPherson struts, lower control arms, coil springs and a stabilizer bar for the front, and a torsion-beam rear axle, along with coil springs and rear stabilizer bars.

The Firenza was launched with a 2.0-liter OHV inline four-cylinder engine as the sole powerplant, but an overhead-cam 1.8-liter engine was added during the model year. Oldsmobile did not utilize turbo on these engines, while Buick and Pontiac offered a turbo.
Wraparound amber turn signal lights were added immediately outboard of the headlights for 1984. In 1985, the 2.8 L LB6 V6 was added as an option with the GT package.

For the Firenza's last model year in 1988, it received a new open grille, aerodynamic composite headlamps, and tail lights, styled after those of the Cutlass Ciera. Also for the Firenza's final year, the hatchback was dropped along with the V6, leaving just the four-cylinder notchback coupe, sedan, and wagon models. Also for 1988, all previous trim-level designations were dropped. All Firenza body styles came in a single unnamed base model that could be equipped with six various option packages.

The Firenza was never a strong seller for Oldsmobile. In keeping with its premium image, Oldsmobile always had better luck selling larger, better equipped cars, most notably its wide range of Cutlass models. Sales of the Firenza were also hampered by Oldsmobile management who fought hard not to have to sell the J-body cars but had to, in order to keep the division’s EPA average fuel economy ratings up to meet General Motors’ corporate standards and in compliance with Federal CAFE regulations. Thus, Oldsmobile did not promote this car very well, instead, choosing to put more marketing effort toward the Cutlass Calais.

Also to blame was competition from the Firenza’s rebadged J-body siblings. Sales of the Cavalier and Sunbird annually dwarfed the Firenza, as they better fit into Chevrolet and Pontiac's value-oriented brand portfolios. Due to this, the Firenza was not replaced in Oldsmobile's lineup, leaving the Cutlass Calais as the division's smallest car. The Cimarron was discontinued that year as well. Leeds Assembly, which built the Firenza, was closed. The Skyhawk lasted another year, while GM kept the first-generation Sunbird and Cavalier in production until 1994.

Trims & options

Sedan:
base • 1982–1988
LX • 1982–1987
Hatchback:
S • 1982–1987
SX • 1982–1985
GT • 1983-1987
Wagon:
Cruiser • 1983–1988
LX Cruiser • 1983–1985
Coupe:
base • 1986–1988
LC • 1986–1987

GT
The Firenza GT was only available on the S Coupe hatchback, unlike the Chevy Cavalier Z24, Buick Skyhawk T-Type, and Pontiac Sunbird GT, which could be had as either two-door hatchbacks, two-door and four-door sedans. Four door hatchbacks of the J-platform were offered in Europe.
  
GTs first were introduced in 1983, 65 were built; red with silver lower panel accent color, sold as "Brass Hat" promotional cars for dealerships, most were equipped with the "new" 1.8-liter overhead cam motor, with either a three-speed automatic or five-speed manual transmission. FE3 suspension was included in the package with a rear-stabilizer bar, heavier struts all the way around, with a wider tire offering on the polycast wheels as standard for the GT package.  1984; red/silver carried over plus white with silver lower body color was added. 2312 GTs were produced, less than 20% were white. Engines either were the 2.0-liter (four-speed manual or three-speed auto) or the 1.8-liter (five-speed manual or three-speed auto). 

For 1985, 498 GTs were built, body colors were changed to either black or gray with silver trim (not as pronounced as with the 1983-84s.)  A fiberglass hood with a pronounced center bulge was included, the 2.6-liter V6 was offered with only the four-speed manual or the three-speed auto, the wheels were changed to aluminum from the previous polycast wheel, this was to be the same for 1986 GT. 1986 was the only year the GT as its own separate trim level (with 1032 built), and the body color red became available again with silver accent. For 1987, the  GT model (of 783 built), went back to an option on the hatchback and was the last year offered, essentially same as 1986, but added the availability of the heavier five-speed manual transmission than was previous on the 1.8-liter offering three years previous, along with three-speed auto. Interesting note; The "GT" was used on the Calais and Ciera in 1987, replacing the "ES" (EuroSport) designation the previous two years, 1984-1985.

The Firenza ES (EuroSport) sedan was introduced in Canada for 1984, and the U.S. in 1985.  Not much is known of this offering, it had blacked out headlight bezels and blacked out trim on the tail lights, the interior upholstery used the same two color gray combo and red piping as with all the GTs. This was offered as a four-door GT trim, with the same polycast wheels, heavier suspension, used on the 1983 and 1984 GT hatchbacks. They were only offered in a dark-silver body color.

Sales

Engines
 1982: 1.8 L L46 carbureted OHV I4
 1982–1986: 1.8 L LH8 TBI SOHC I4
 1983-1986: 2.0 L LQ5 TBI OHV I4
 1987–1988: 2.0 L LT2 TBI SOHC I4
 1987–1988: 2.0 L LL8 TBI OHV I4
 1985–1987: 2.8 L LB6 MPFI OHV V6

References

External links
 MSN-autos.com - 1988 Oldsmobile Firenza model overview
 MSN-autos.com - 1988 Oldsmobile Firenza Cruiser model overview

Firenza
Compact cars
Front-wheel-drive vehicles
Hatchbacks
Coupés
Sedans
Station wagons
Cars introduced in 1982
1980s cars
Cars discontinued in 1988